The 1994 Kyrgyzstan League is the 3rd season of Kyrgyzstan League, the Football Federation of Kyrgyz Republic's top division of association football. Kant Oil Kant won the league in which fourteen teams participated in.

League standings

Notes
Many games, especially against Kokart Dzhalalabad and Uchkun Kara Suu, were awarded, two were apparently awarded against both teams.
This causes the irregularities in the win/loss and goals for/goals against columns.

Withdrawn Teams
SKA Dostuk Sokuluk, finished in 4th place, Ysyk Kol Karakol, finished in 9th place and Maksat Belovodskoye, finished in 16th place all withdrew before the 1994 season.

References

Kyrgyzstan - List of final tables (RSSSF)

Kyrgyzstan League seasons
1
Kyrgyzstan
Kyrgyzstan